Lee Joon-sik is a Korean politician and former professor of mechanical engineering at Seoul National University. He served as  Minister of Education and Deputy Prime Minister of South Korea. He was appointed as Deputy Prime Minister of South Korea by former president Park Geun-hye.

References 

Living people
Year of birth missing (living people)